Motyka is a Polish surname meaning "hoe". Notable people with the surname include:
 Józef Motyka (1900–1984), Polish botanist and lichenologist
 Grzegorz Motyka (born 1967), Polish historian
 Grzegorz Motyka (born 1972), Polish footballer
 Marek Motyka (born 1958), Polish footballer
 Stanisław Motyka (1906–1941), Polish skier
 Tomasz Motyka (born 1972), Polish footballer
 Tomasz Motyka (born 1981), Polish fencer
 Zdzisław Motyka (1907–1969), Polish skier

See also
 

Polish-language surnames